No Hiding Place is a British television series that was produced at Wembley Studios by Associated-Rediffusion for the ITV network between 16 September 1959 and 22 June 1967.

It was the sequel to the series Murder Bag (1957–1958) and Crime Sheet (1959), all starring Raymond Francis as Detective Superintendent, later Detective Chief Superintendent Tom Lockhart.

Production
No Hiding Place carried on from where the TV series Murder Bag and Crime Sheet left off. Murder Bag featured 55 episodes. 30 in Season One (16 September 1957 to 31 March 1958), all untitled (having case numbers, and were listed a Murder Bag - case One, etc)  and 25 in Season Two (30 June 1958 to 1 April 1959), all titled, and all featuring the word "Lockhart" as the first word of their title. Half-hour detective series that introduced viewers to the snuff-taking as Detective Superintendent Lockhart, played by Raymond Francis. It was created by Glyn Davies, Produced by Barry Baker and written by Barry Baker and Peter Ling Backup sergeants and others changed regularly. The murder bag in the title carried 42 items which were needed in the investigation of a crime. The show was produced live in the studio. According to IMDb there were 29 episodes in series one and 40 in series two.

In Crime Sheet, Lockhart had now been promoted to Detective Chief Superintendent. The writers of the series revealed to the TV Times in 1962 that Lockhart could not be promoted above this rank, as he would no longer be expected to visit the crime scene, thus hindering the potential of the storylines. 17 episodes (23 episodes according to IMDb) of 30 minutes were produced from 8 April 1959 to 9 September 1959. Due to Raymond Francis contracting mumps, the final episode of Crime Sheet did not feature Lockhart but Chief Superintendent Carr, played by Gerald Case.

No Hiding Place continued to follow the cases of Detective Chief Superintendent Tom Lockhart at Scotland Yard, with a new longer one-hour format allowing for more story and character development. He was initially assisted by Detective Sergeant later Inspector Harry Baxter (Eric Lander), followed by Det. Sgt. Russell (Johnny Briggs) and Det. Sgt. Perryman (Michael McStay), and finally by Det. Sgt. Gregg (Sean Caffrey).

Crossover episode - One 1962 episode, broadcast on 25 September, series 4, episode 21, The Most Beautiful Room in the World,  saw a guest appearance of Patrick Cargill in the guise of Top Secret (TV series) Miquel Garetta.

Still largely studio-based, the series now included more pre-filmed sequences. A decision was made to cancel the series in 1965, but there were so many protests from the public and the police that it returned for another two years. 236 episodes were made in total.

Detective Sergeant Harry Baxter was there from episode one until episode 141. Midway through the series he was transferred to E Division's Q Car Squad and promoted from Sergeant to Inspector, a rank he retained when he returned to the Yard in 1963. Baxter had his own short TV series, Echo Four-Two. Unfortunately the show suffered from poor scripts and of 13 planned episodes, only 10 were made (30 minutes each, 24 August 1961 to 25 October 1961), interrupted by an actor's strike, and no more were made.

The No Hiding Place theme music, was performed by Ken Mackintosh and his orchestra, entered the charts in 1960.

Cast

Missing episodes
Murder Bag and Crime Sheet are considered lost television series; according to www.lostshows.com, no complete episodes of the former exist, and only one survives of the latter. However, one episode of Murder Bag (retitled Mystery Bag), "Lockhart Finds a Note", was found in the form of a film telerecording from Australia, and included on Network's ITV 60 compilation box set. The longer-running No Hiding Place fared marginally better than its predecessors, although only 26 of the 236 episodes produced are known to exist in either a full or partial form. This figure includes episodes known to be held by the National Film and Television Archive and those held in private collections. Some early episodes were broadcast live and were not recorded.

References

 The Penguin TV Companion by Jeff Evans

External links
  Murder Bag IMDb
  Crime Sheet IMDb
 
 British Film Institute Screen Online
 No Hiding Place Episode Archive Status
 Eric Lander obituary

1950s British crime television series
1960s British crime television series
ITV television dramas
1959 British television series debuts
1967 British television series endings
1950s British drama television series
1960s British drama television series
Black-and-white British television shows
Lost television shows
Television shows produced by Associated-Rediffusion
English-language television shows